Zardkam (also Romanized as Zardkām; also known as Palang Posht) is a village in Ahmadsargurab Rural District, Ahmadsargurab District, Shaft County, Gilan Province, Iran. At the 2006 census, its population was 74, in 18 families.

References 

Populated places in Shaft County